Walter Brune (14 February 1926 – 5 November 2021) was a German architect, urban planner, and real estate entrepreneur.

Professional career
Brune was born in Bremen. As a young engineering graduate he became independent after three years of practice in the office of Professor Gustav August Munzer in 1950. He first worked for the heavy industry and built in the early 1950s – as a very young architect – the coal mine "Prosper Haniel", as well as several power plants, winding towers, etc.. In the late 1950s, the store-company Karstadt noticed him. For this group he built department stores for 20 years. The highlight was the design and construction of the Karstadt department store head office in Essen. Numerous buildings for commerce, industry and administration for other companies also fell within this period. For two decades, between 1950 and 1970, he developed alongside the major projects country houses for numerous personalities from business and industry (Helmut Horten, Wolf, Bauknecht, etc.) in the bungalow style, which were introduced in the architectural magazines around the world due to their uniqueness. In his period Walter Brune operated one of the busiest architectural offices in the Federal Republic of Germany, with satellite offices in New York, Tehran, Kabul and in the Netherlands. The World Bank commissioned him in partnership with the renowned American architect Marcel Breuer to design large-scale development projects. For the Shah of Persia, he created the design of a new city on the Caspian Sea (Namak Abroud).

Entrepreneurial activity
Walter Brune put earned money repeatedly in real estate. The building development he conducted already in the 1960s, carried out parallel to his architectural practice. His motivation for this activity was always the worry of being able to pay his many skilled employees because of temporary absence of contract or project delays and the worry of losing them with this. His entrepreneurial activity was less professional goal but a logical consequence of his thinking. The result was until today a large real estate company.

Development of retail architecture
Since the early 1980s, he made himself a name in personal union as an architect, developer, consultant and operator of shopping centers built in an urban area. The insight about the negative impacts of large shopping center (which he himself proposed in 1970 RheinRuhrZentrum in Mülheim an der Ruhr) is the reason for him to develop the concept of a "City Gallery", a multifunctional scale retail architecture adapted to the inner-block structures form, which he first implemented at the "Kö-Galerie" in Düsseldorf. The city of Eindhoven entrusted him with the help of "Heuvel Galerie" to revive their former derelict city center. A symbiosis of old existing structures with a new architecture, adapted to the local tradition of building, which includes retail, services, housing and culture in the form of a concert hall, was the result.

Advocate for the importance of vibrant inner cities
In addition to operating as a designer, developer, he operated for years as an urban fighter for the preservation of living downtown areas in the growing inner cities. Last but not least because of the negative impacts of large and non-integrated shopping center, he is an active publicist, inter alia with the book "Angriff auf die City" (Düsseldorf, 2006).

Awards
 1960: Award of the BDA (Association of German Architects) for the construction of a Feingusswerkes
 1987: ICSC European Shopping Center Award "Shopping Center of the Year 1986" for the 1986 completed Kö-Galerie
 1989: Federal Cross of Merit for his inventiveness, his professional dedication and his willingness to corporate responsibility
 1991: Bouwforum Leonardo da Vinci for the Heuvel Galerie in Eindhoven / The Netherlands and the 1992 ICSC commendation for excellence for the outstanding project of an urban shopping center
 1994: ICSC European Shopping Center Award for the redesign of the Rhein Ruhr Center Mülheim
 1995: ICSC European Shopping Center Award 1995 for the Schadow Arcades Düsseldorf as the best European inner-city shopping center
 2005: urbanicom Prize for his lifetime achievements as an architect, planner, developer, media and cultural ambassador and champion for the city

Works (selection)

 Barbarahof (Residential building), Düsseldorf, 1951
 Zeche Franz Haniel, Bottrop, 1951–55
 House Horten, Düsseldorf, 1956
 House in the Vineyard, Alsace, 1958
 Department store Karstadt Bremerhaven, 1958
 Haus Stoeckel, Ratingen-Breitscheid, 1959
 Outils-Wolf, factory for garden tools, Wissembourg, 1959–60
 House Dr. Berg, Düsseldorf, 1961
 Head office Karstadt, Essen, 1965–69
 House Starke, Essen, 1967
 Residential complex Münsterpark, Düsseldorf, 1970–75
 Kö-Galerie, Düsseldorf, 1983–86
 Heuvel-Galerie, Eindhoven, 1989–92
 Schadow-Arkaden, Düsseldorf, 1988–93
 Königs-Galerie, Kassel, 1992–95

References

Bibliography
 Walter Brune: Die Stadtgalerie. Ein Beitrag zur Wiederbelebung der Innenstädte. Frankfurt am Main, New York 1996
 Walter Brune, Rolf Junker, Holger Pump-Uhlmann (Hrsg.): Angriff auf die City. Kritische Texte zur Konzeption, Planung und Wirkung von integrierten und nicht integrierten Shopping-Centern in zentralen Lagen. Düsseldorf 2006
 Holger Pump-Uhlmann: Der erweiterte Lebensraum: Bungalows von Walter Brune. JOVIS Verlag Berlin 2008, 
 Holger Pump-Uhlmann: From Department Store to 'Stadtgalerie': Buildings for Retail Trade by Walter Brune. JOVIS Verlag Berlin 2011, 

1926 births
2021 deaths
20th-century German architects
Recipients of the Cross of the Order of Merit of the Federal Republic of Germany
Architects from Bremen